The  is an AC/DC dual-voltage electric multiple unit (EMU) train type operated by East Japan Railway Company (JR East) in Japan on limited express services between  in Tokyo and  on the Joban Line since March 2012.

The trains replaced the 651 series and E653 series EMUs previously used on Super Hitachi and Fresh Hitachi limited express services on the Joban Line. The first train in revenue service ran on 3 March 2012, in the form of a special return  Super Hitachi limited express service between Ueno and Iwaki, with regular scheduled services starting from the revised timetable on 17 March 2012. The initial order of sixteen 10-car sets was in service by the start of the revised timetable on 16 March 2013.

Design
The front end design is derived from the earlier Super Hitachi 651 series trains, and the pale pink body colour with red lining is intended to evoke an image of the ume plums for which the area served by the trains is famous.

The end cars and Green (first class) cars feature full active suspension for improved ride quality, and yaw dampers are fitted between cars.

Bogies
The DT78 (motored) and TR263 (trailer) bolsterless bogies are developed from the DT77 and TR262 bogies used on the E259 series EMUs, with improvements to cope with the increased vehicle weight and provide increased snow and cold weather resistance. The end bogies of the Tc driving cars are designated TR263, the inner bogies of the Tc driving cars and the Ts car are designated TR263A, and the bogies on the T1 car are designated TR262B. All the bogies use tread brakes, and the trailer bogies additionally use two disc brakes per axle.

Formation
Each unit consists of ten cars, formed as shown below, with car 1 at the Ueno end. The six "M" cars are motored.

Cars 2, 6, and 8 each have one PS37A single-arm pantograph.

Interior

AC power outlets are provided at each seat, and WiMAX wireless broadband internet access is available. The trains include universal access toilets and security cameras.

Between October 2013 and around March 2015, the fleet was scheduled to be retro-fitted with LED seat reservation status indicators above each seat.

History
In March 2011, the first completed five cars (half a set - cars 1 to 5) were delivered from Kinki Sharyo's Osaka factory and moved to Hitachi's factory in Yamaguchi Prefecture. The first 10-car set was then scheduled to be moved from Hitachi's factory to JR East's Katsuta Depot on the Jōban Line in April, but this was postponed until May 2011 due to the 2011 Tōhoku earthquake and tsunami. Test running on the Jōban Line commenced on 27 May 2011.

Seven sets were delivered for the start of the revised timetable from 17 March 2012.

The first E657 series set built by Japan Transport Engineering Company (J-TREC) in Yokohama, K-9, was delivered in August 2012. This was also the first train to be built for JR East by the company following its renaming from Tokyu Car Corporation.

Fleet/build details
The manufacturers and delivery dates for the fleet are as shown below.

References

External links

 JR East press release announcing new trains 
 JR East: E657 series Super Hitachi/Fresh Hitachi 

East Japan Railway Company
Jōban Line
Electric multiple units of Japan
Hitachi multiple units
Train-related introductions in 2012
20 kV AC multiple units
J-TREC multiple units
1500 V DC multiple units of Japan
Kinki Sharyo multiple units